Mehdi Rabbi (born in 1980 in Ahvaz) is an Iranian short story writer.

Biography 
He did his bachelor's degree in accounting and his master's degree in literature. Since 2014, he has been doing his PhD in the philosophy of art at the Islamic Azad University, Science and Research Branch, Tehran. He also teaches how to write the short story and playwright at the University of Art in Tehran.

Books 
 An goosheh denj samte chap, Cheshmeh publishing
 Boro velgardi kon rafigh, Cheshmeh publishing

Critics on his works 
The critics on the works of Mehdi Rabbi have been published in the media.
Alireza Farahani's critic on Mehdi Rabbi's short stories, Kargozaran newspaper, 2008
Reza Ghanbari's critic on Mehdi Rabbi's short stories, Iran book news agency, 2008

Awards 
Mehdi Rabbi has been awarded several literary awards for his books in Iran. Here is the list of some of his awards:
 The Printed matter critics award, 2007
 Isfahan literary award, 2007
 Candidate for Golshiri award, 2007

Notes

References 
 Farahani, Alireza, Kargozaran newspaper, 609, 2008
 Ghanbari, Reza, Iranian book news agency, 2008
 Mehdi Rabbi on the website of the Iranian Students News Agency, 2016
 Mehdi Rabbi on the website of the Iranian Students News Agency, 2016

External links 
 Blog of Mehdi Rabbi
 Mehdi Rabbi, The Iranian Students News Agency website, 2016
 Mehdi Rabbi, The Iranian Students News Agency website, 2016

Living people
People from Ahvaz
1980 births
Iranian fiction writers
Iranian male short story writers